Joseph James Broadfoot (born 4 March 1940) is an English former professional footballer. During his career he made over 250 appearances for Millwall and over 100 for Ipswich Town in two spells for both clubs.

Ipswich paid £16,000 for Broadfoot in October 1963.

References

External links 
Joe Broadfoot at Pride of Anglia

Living people
1940 births
Association football wingers
Millwall F.C. players
Ipswich Town F.C. players
Northampton Town F.C. players
English footballers